Cheryl Irene Hanna (born January 7, 1951) is an American artist and illustrator. Hanna was born in Ann Arbor, Michigan, dropped out of Pratt Institute before she received her B.A. from Pratt Institute in 1973.

Hanna is a painter, children's book illustrator who is also known for her work in the medium of collage. Hanna's work has been exhibited at the Newark Museum and the National Museum of Women in the Arts. Hanna's 1987 book, "The Enchanted Hair Tale", in collaboration with author Alexis de Veaux was honored by the Coretta Scott King Award. She has also illustrated biographies of Phillis Wheatley, Selma Burke, and Mary Fields.

References 

Living people
1951 births
American illustrators
20th-century American painters
People from Ann Arbor, Michigan
Pratt Institute alumni
21st-century African-American artists
20th-century African-American painters
21st-century American painters